"Oh Happy Day" is a 1967 gospel music arrangement of the 1755 hymn by clergyman Philip Doddridge. Recorded by the Edwin Hawkins Singers, it became an international hit in 1969, reaching No. 4 on the US Singles Chart, No. 1 in France, Germany, and the Netherlands and No. 2 on the Canadian Singles Chart, UK Singles Chart, and Irish Singles Chart. It has since become a gospel music standard.

The recording begins with a muted piano, drum, and bass, backing lead singer Dorothy Combs Morrison on the left-hand stereo channel, then alternates twice with a full-throated chorus that includes a large ensemble, rising to a crescendo with handclaps, and ending with a return to the muted sound as at the beginning. The track is notable for its clear sound given the powerful vocals and the modest equipment used to capture them. It was made at Hawkins' church, the Ephesian Church of God in Christ in Berkeley, California.

Origins
The gospel style arrangement of the hymn "Oh, Happy Day" by Edwin Hawkins has a long pedigree. It began as a hymn, written in the mid-18th century ("O happy day, that fixed my choice"), by English clergyman Philip Doddridge (based on Acts 8:35) set to a 1704 melody by J. A. Freylinghausen. By the mid-19th century it had been given a new melody by Edward F. Rimbault, who also added a chorus, and was commonly used for baptismal or confirmation ceremonies in the UK and USA.

The B-side of the single was Hawkins' own modern arrangement of "Jesus, Lover of My Soul" originally written by Charles Wesley in 1740.

Recording
Hawkins rearranged the hymn to give it more of a gospel feel, and devised a piano introduction which he said was influenced by the music of Sérgio Mendes.  When the choir made the recording in 1967, lead singer Dorothy Morrison added some lyrical improvisations influenced by James Brown, which, she said, "made the song feel even more current".

Legacy and influence
Hawkins' arrangement quickly became a “standard” and has been recorded by hundreds of artists. It was included on the RIAA Songs of the Century list and won Hawkins a Grammy Award for Best Soul Gospel Performance in 1970 (performed by the Edwin Hawkins Singers).

In live performances and acoustic versions of the Nick Cave song "Deanna" (1988), portions of "Oh Happy Day" are included, revealing the inspiration for Cave's song. George Harrison has stated the song was a primary inspiration in the writing of his 1970 international hit single "My Sweet Lord."

The song has appeared in many movies, beginning with the German film  in 1970, but most notably Whoopi Goldberg's Sister Act 2, with then 14-year-old Ryan Toby singing lead. The song also appears in Big Momma's House, Nutty Professor II: The Klumps, David LaChapelle's 2005 movie Rize, Robin Williams’s 2007 movie License to Wed, the 2010 biographical film produced by Walt Disney Pictures: Secretariat (played when Secretariat wins the Belmont), and Spike Lee's BlacKkKlansman.

The Edwin Hawkins Singers' performance of the song at the 1969 Harlem Cultural Festival appears in the 2021 music documentary, Summer of Soul.

The song is regularly performed by space-rock band Spiritualized as the last song of their live sets.

Personnel
Dorothy Combs Morrison – lead vocal
Edwin Hawkins – choir director, arranger, piano
Betty Watson – co-director, soprano vocals 
Choir Members – Walter Hawkins, Tramaine Hawkins, Elaine Kelly, Margarette Branch, Rueben Franklin, Donald Cashmere, Ruth Lyons and 40 others
Drums, bass and percussion – unconfirmed (probably Bennie Bolton, drums, and Harley White, bass.)
Recorded live  at the Ephesian Church of God in Christ, Berkeley, California

The song was also included on the album Let Us Go Into the House of the Lord (1968). It was released as a 7-inch single on Pavilion Records in April 1969, then on the Buddah Records album It's a Happy Day also in 1969.

Chart performance

Weekly charts

Year-end charts

Awards
1970 Grammy Award for Best Soul Gospel Performance

Other notable versions
 Joan Baez performed the song at Woodstock in 1969.
 Glen Campbell covered the song on his 1970 album Oh Happy Day. The single reached No. 45 on the U.S. Billboard Hot 100, No.  7 Adult Contemporary, and No. 44 in Canada.
 Aretha Franklin covered the song on her 1987 album One Lord, One Faith, One Baptism.
 Club Nouveau included the song on their 1992 album A New Beginning. The single charted at No. 45 on the US R&B Chart.

References

Notes

Sources
Original Seeds, CD liner notes by Kim Beissel

External links
 , at the 2014 World Choir Games in Riga; solo by Walt Whitman
 

18th-century songs
1969 singles
Glen Campbell songs
CeCe Peniston songs
Gospel songs
Number-one singles in France
Number-one singles in Germany
Number-one singles in Switzerland
Grammy Hall of Fame Award recipients
Buddah Records singles
United States National Recording Registry recordings
Songs about Jesus